Dominika Lásková (born 20 December 1996) is a Czech ice hockey player and member of the Czech national ice hockey team, currently playing in the Premier Hockey Federation (PHF) with the Toronto Six. Her college ice hockey career was spent with the Merrimack Warriors women's ice hockey program in the Hockey East conference of the NCAA Division I. She played with the women's representative team of HC Slavia Praha in the Czech Women's Extraliga during 2011 to 2016.

Lásková represented the Czech Republic at the IIHF Women's U18 World Championships in 2012, 2013, and 2014, winning a bronze medal at the 2014 tournament. She first appeared with the Czech senior national team at the final qualification for the women's ice hockey tournament at the 2014 Winter Olympics. She has since appeared with the national team at the 2013 IIHF Women's World Championship, the 2014 IIHF Women's World Championship Division IA and Top Division Playoff, and the 2021 IIHF Women's World Championship.

References

External links 
 
 

Living people
1996 births
Czech expatriate ice hockey players in Canada
Czech expatriate ice hockey players in the United States
Czech women's ice hockey defencemen
Ice hockey people from Prague
Ice hockey players at the 2022 Winter Olympics
Merrimack Warriors women's ice hockey players
Olympic ice hockey players of the Czech Republic
Toronto Six players